Indivior is a specialty pharmaceuticals business. It is listed on the London Stock Exchange and is a constituent of the FTSE 250 Index.

History
The company was established as the Buprenorphine division of Reckitt Benckiser in 1994. In December 2014, Reckitt Benckiser spun off its specialty pharmaceuticals business into a separate company named Indivior. By February 2015, the company was capitalised at £2.3 billion (US$3.1 billion) on the London Stock Exchange.

In 2019, Indivior was indicted over claims that it had made false marketing claims about the safety of its drug, Suboxone, and had concocted a scheme to direct patients towards doctors who were likely to prescribe Suboxone. Reckitt Benckiser has settled with the Justice Department to pay $1.4 billion to resolve a U.S. Federal investigation into sales and marketing of opioid addiction treatment.

In July 2020, Indivior Solutions, Indivior Inc., and Indivior PLC agreed to pay $600 million to resolve liability related to false marketing of Suboxone to MassHealth for use by patients with children under the age of six years old. Additionally, Indivior Solutions Inc pled guilty to one-count of felony information.

In November 2022, it was announced Indivior had acquired the Santa Monica-headquartered, NASDAQ-listed biopharmaceutical company, Opiant.

Operations
The company's main products are Sublocade, Subutex and its Naloxone-combined preparation Suboxone, both substitution products for opioid addiction. Other products include remedies for cocaine and opioid analgesic overdose and treatment for alcohol dependence: the company claims this to be the largest pipeline of addiction drugs in the world.

References

External links
Official site

Pharmaceutical companies established in 1994
Companies based in Slough